Vanuatu Sports Awards is the yearly award ceremony to honour the best athletes of the calendar year in Vanuatu. It was established in 2019 by the Vanuatu Association of Sports and National Olympic Committee.

History

The idea of the Vanuatu Sports Awards was first reported on 7 February 2019. The winners of the award were announced on 30 April 2019.

The 2020 edition wasn't held without public notice.

Award Winners

Vanuatu

References 

Sport in Vanuatu
Sports award winners